The Pinchcliffe Grand Prix is a 1975 Norwegian stop-motion-animated feature film directed by Ivo Caprino. It is based on characters from a series of books by Norwegian cartoonist and author Kjell Aukrust.

It is the most widely seen Norwegian film of all time, having sold some 5.5 million tickets since its release to a population which currently numbers just over 5 million.

Plot

In the village of Flåklypa, (En. Pinchcliffe), the inventor Reodor Felgen (En. Theodore Rimspoke) lives with his animal friends Ludvig (En. Lambert) (a nervous, pessimistic and melancholic hedgehog) and Solan Gundersen (En. Sonny Duckworth) (a cheerful and optimistic magpie). Reodor works as a bicycle repairman, though he spends most of his time inventing weird Rube Goldberg-like contraptions. One day, the trio discovers that one of Reodor's former assistants, Rudolf Blodstrupmoen (En. Rudolph Gore-Slimey), has stolen his design for a race car engine and has become a world champion Formula One driver. Solan secures funding from Arab oil sheik Ben Redic Fy Fazan (En. Abdul Ben Bonanza), who happens to be vacationing in Flåklypa, and to enter the race, the trio builds a gigantic racing car: Il Tempo Gigante—a fabulous construction with two extremely big engines (weighing 2.8 tonnes alone and making the seismometer in Bergen show 7.8 Richter when started the first time), a body made out of copper, a spinning radar (that turns out to be useful when Blodstrupmoen starts engaging in smoke warfare during the race), super-retometric distributor and its own blood bank. Reodor ends up winning despite Blodstrupmoen's attempts at sabotage.

History
In 1970, Ivo Caprino and his small team of collaborators started work on a 25-minute-long TV special, which would eventually become The Pinchcliffe Grand Prix. The TV special was a collection of sketches based on Aukrust's books, with no real storyline. After 1.5 years of work, it was decided that it didn't really work as a whole, so production on the TV special was stopped (with the exception of some very short clips, no material from it has ever been seen by the public). About one year after the rejection, Ivo Caprino's son, Remo Caprino, got the idea to make the sketches into a full-length film. Kjell Aukrust, Ivo Caprino, Kjell Syversen, and Remo Caprino began at that point to write the script for what would later become The Pinchcliffe Grand Prix.

The film is heavily inspired by the birthplace of Kjell Aukrust's father, Lom. The Flåklypa-mountain is a stylized version of a real mountain, where the valley underneath it is named Flåklypa. It is also widely believed that the characters are caricatures of real persons.

The film was made in 3.5 years by a team of approximately five people. Caprino directed and animated; Bjarne Sandemose (Caprino's principal collaborator throughout his career) built most of the props, sets, and cars and was in charge of the technical aspects of making the film; Ingeborg Riiser designed the puppets and Gerd Alfsen made the costumes and props.  Charley Patey was the cameraman.

When it came out in 1975, The Pinchcliffe Grand Prix was an enormous success in Norway, selling 1 million tickets in its first year of release. It remains the biggest box office hit of all time in Norway (Caprino Studios claim it has sold 5.5 million tickets to date) and was also released in many other countries. The film held the record for the highest grossing stop motion animated film until it was surpassed in 1993 by The Nightmare Before Christmas. The film was shown in cinemas every day of the week for 28 years, from 1975 until 2003—mainly in Norway, Moscow and Tokyo. A real Il tempo gigante car was used to promote the film, e.g. driving around the Hockenheimring between races. The car originally had a 250 hp Cadillac engine but when Niki Lauda saw it he provided them with a 7.6 L, 550 hp, big-block Chevrolet. The car also has an auxiliary jet-engine, but due to EU restrictions the vehicle is barely permitted to be used at all save for exclusive TV cameos.

The UK release featured the voice of well-known Formula One commentator Murray Walker. There is also a US dubbed version.

The film was first released on DVD in 2001. In 2005, a digitally restored 30th-anniversary DVD was released which featured soundtracks and subtitles in five languages including English.

The film aired every Christmas Eve in Norway for several years, until a change of channel from NRK to TV 2 changed the airing date to 23 or 25 December. In 2009 it showed on the 25th.

It was released on 8 May 1980 in Australian theaters by Filmways Australia and released in US and Canada in 1981.

Subsequent films based on Aukrust's Flåklypa universe 
 Gurin with the Foxtail (1998)
 Solan og Ludvig - Jul i Flåklypa (2013)
 Solan og Ludvig: Herfra til Flåklypa (2015)
 Månelyst i Flåklypa (2018)

Other works inspired 
In 2000, a computer game based on the film was released. The game was created by Tyr Neilsen who was Creative Director and in charge of production at Ingames Interactive until a debilitating accident ended his video game career. The project was taken over and completed by Caprino's son Remo, while his grandson Mario was lead programmer. The lead designer was Joe Dever. The game was ported to Nintendo DS in 2010 and sold over 380,000 copies in Norway.

The film inspired a young Christian von Koenigsegg to create the Koenigsegg CC, the first of the Koenigsegg make of supercars.

Norwegian hip-hop duo Multicyde based their 1999 single "Not for the Dough" on a sample from the movie's soundtrack and featured excerpts from the film in the song's music video.

See also
 List of animated feature films
 List of stop-motion films

References

External links

 
 
 Official website (in English)

1975 animated films
1975 films
1970s Norwegian-language films
Norwegian animated films
Norwegian children's films
1970s stop-motion animated films
Animated sports films
Norwegian auto racing films
Animated films about auto racing
Animated films about automobiles
Films directed by Ivo Caprino